David Lewis Smith (May 18, 1947 – May 22, 2020) was an American professional football player who was a wide receiver in the National Football League (NFL). He was selected by the Pittsburgh Steelers in the eighth round of the 1970 NFL Draft. He played college football and basketball at Indiana (PA) and Waynesburg.

Smith was known for a fumble in a Monday Night Football game against the Kansas City Chiefs while trying to score a touchdown, and led the Steelers in touchdown receptions in 1971.  He also played for the Houston Oilers and Kansas City.

Smith died on May 22, 2020, at age 73.

References

1947 births
2020 deaths
Players of American football from New York City
American football wide receivers
IUP Crimson Hawks football players
IUP Crimson Hawks men's basketball players
Waynesburg Yellow Jackets football players
Pittsburgh Steelers players
Houston Oilers players
Kansas City Chiefs players
American men's basketball players